Thomas Fabbiano was the defending champion, but chose not to compete.

Gilles Müller won the title, defeating Ilija Bozoljac 6–1, 6–2 in the final.

Seeds

  Gilles Müller (champion)
  Ričardas Berankis (first round)
  Andrej Martin (withdrew)
  Márton Fucsovics (semifinals)
  Adrián Menéndez-Maceiras (quarterfinals)
  David Guez (first round)
  Konstantin Kravchuk (semifinals)
  Ilija Bozoljac (final)
  Nikoloz Basilashvili (first round)

Draw

Finals

Top half

Bottom half

References
 Main Draw
 Qualifying Draw

Guzzini Challenger - Singles
2014 Singles